No Parking is a 1938 British comedy film directed by Jack Raymond. The film features Charles Carson, Geraldo, Fred Groves, Gordon Harker and Leslie Perrins in the lead roles.

The story was written by Carol Reed who later directed The Third Man.

The film is considered lost, as no prints are known to exist.

Plot summary
Albert is the unfortunate car park attendant who gets caught up with jewel thieves mistaking him for the American gangster they've been waiting to join forces with. However, on the day of the heist, the real American gangster turns up, and Albert is revealed as an undercover policeman.

Cast
 Charles Carson as Hardcastle
 Geraldo as Orchestra Leader
 Fred Groves as Walsh
 Gordon Harker as Albert
 George Hayes as James Selby
 Leslie Perrins as Captain Sneyd
 Cyril Smith as Stanley
 Frank Stanmore as Gus
 Irene Ware as Olga

References

External links

British comedy films
1938 comedy films
1938 films
Films directed by Jack Raymond
British black-and-white films
1930s English-language films
1930s British films